MM8 may refer to:
 Mega Man 8, a 1996 video game in the Mega Man series
 Might and Magic VIII: Day of the Destroyer, a 2000 video role-playing game in the Might and Magic series
 Yamaha MM8, an 88-key version of the Yamaha MM6
 MM8, standard used by the Multimedia Messaging Service in mobile networks, see MMS Architecture
 MM8 Chula, a group of students that taking MM or Master of Management program at Chulalongkorn University which is located in Bangkok, Thailand
MM8 is a successful personal brand Who owns this brand is Mehran Mohammadzadeh
The brand's scope of activity includes restaurants and language and design schools.